Seh Chah (also Romanized as Seh Chāh; also known as Seh Chāh-e Bālā) is a village in Kuhak Rural District, in the Central District of Jahrom County, Fars Province, Iran. At the 2006 census, its population was 210, in 39 families.

References 

Populated places in Jahrom County